Alberto García Fernández (born 22 February 1971 in Madrid, Spain) is a Spanish long-distance and cross-country runner.

Career
Garcia's top-level athletic career took off when he was already approaching his thirties. He first came to prominence with a gold medal in the 5000 metres at the Mediterranean Games at Bari in 1997. The following year he finished 19th in the short race at the 1998 IAAF World Cross Country Championships and then finished 49th in the 1999 IAAF World Cross Country Championships. In the 2000 IAAF World Cross Country Championships he ran the long race and came in 29th. He failed to qualify for the 5000 metres finals at the 1999 World Championships and 2000 Olympics, but then came fourth in the 5000 metres at the 2001 World Championships and in the following year he became the European 5000 metres champion at the 2002 European Athletics Championships.

After serving a two-year suspension for doping, Garcia returned to competitive athletics. He finished second in the 2005 European Cross Country Championships behind Serhiy Lebid, and won the Cross Internacional de Venta de Baños. On the track, he was unable to reach the best times that he had recorded before his suspension.

García competed at the 2008 Summer Olympics in the 5000 metres, but did not qualify from the heats.

Doping history
In May 2003 it was announced that Garcia had tested positive for the banned blood-booster Erythropoietin (EPO), following a control carried out on 29 March 2003 at Lausanne after the 2003 IAAF World Cross Country Championships. For this he received a two-year ban from competition.

On 9 December 2010 García was arrested and questioned in relation to his involvement in a Spanish athletics doping ring as part of Operation Galgo, an investigation being carried out by the Guardia Civil. On release from questioning he strongly denied to the press that he had engaged in drug trafficking.

Records
1500 m: 3.35,69 (2001)
Mile: 3.58,81 (1998)
2000 m: 4.56,08 (1997)
3000 m: 7.36,53 (2001)
5000 m: 13.02,54 (2001)
10000 m: 27.46,12 (1999)

See also
List of sportspeople sanctioned for doping offences

References

External links
 
 
 
 

1971 births
Living people
Spanish male long-distance runners
Athletes (track and field) at the 2000 Summer Olympics
Athletes (track and field) at the 2008 Summer Olympics
Olympic athletes of Spain
Doping cases in athletics
Spanish sportspeople in doping cases
Athletes from Madrid
European Athletics Championships medalists
Mediterranean Games gold medalists for Spain
Mediterranean Games medalists in athletics
Athletes (track and field) at the 1997 Mediterranean Games